Cell potential may refer to:
 Electrode potential
 Membrane potential, the potential across the membrane of a biological cell
 Standard electrode potential